KP Unia Racibórz is a football club from Racibórz, Silesia, Poland.

History

As part of a sports club
Unia Racibórz was founded on 27 April 1946 as a men's team. Its initial name was Klub Sportowy Plania Racibórz. The club has undergone several name changes. From June 1949 to November 1949 it was named ZKS Chemik Racibórz, then it was called ZKS Unia Racibórz (until 18 March 1957), and KS Unia Racibórz up to the 1997–98 season before adopting the name RTP Unia Racibórz. Until 2001, the year the women started training, the club had only a men's football team. The women's team was registered for league play in the 2002–03 season.

In January 2008, after discrepancies over the use of finances, the men's section split from RTP Unia and took the name KP Unia Racibórz. Thus RTP Unia Racibórz became exclusively a women's football club.

As a section and independent club
Men's team of Unia Racibórz won in 1957 regional competition of Opole Silesia, and qualified for the Second Division playoffs. After beating Victoria Częstochowa, Wawel Wirek and Lublinianka, Unia won promotion to the 1958 Second Division, which at that time was the second level of Polish football system, consisting of 24 teams, divided into two groups, North and South. In its first Second Division season, Unia was 4th in Group South, behind Górnik Radlin, Szombierki Bytom and Stal Mielec. Unia was twice U-19 Champion of Poland, in 1954 and 1956. Based on this very talented generation of young players, in 1959 Unia was very close to the promotion to the Ekstraklasa, finishing the season in the 2nd spot of Group South of the Second Division, one point behind Zagłębie Sosnowiec.

In 1960, Unia was moved to Group North of the Second Division, finishing the season in the third spot, behind Lech Poznań and Zawisza Bydgoszcz. For the 1961 season, one group of the Second Division was formed, with 18 teams. Unia finished in the 5th position, with Gwardia Warszawa as the champion of the Polish second level. In 1962, after another change, Unia was 4th in Group A of the Second Division. Finally, in 1963, Unia won promotion to the elite Ekstraklasa, finishing as the second team of the national Second Division, four points behind Szombierki Bytom, and one point above Raków Częstochowa.

Unia spent only two seasons in the Ekstraklasa. In 1963/64, it was ranked 8th out of 14 teams and in 1964/65 it was the last team of the league, with only 14 points and a goal difference of 32–75. After relegation, Unia was third in the 1965/66 season of the Second Division, behind Cracovia and Pogoń Szczecin. In 1966/67, it was the fourth team of the Second Division, and in 1967/68, fifth. In 1968/69 Unia again was the fourth team of the Second Division, and in 1969/70, seventh. Finally, in 1970/71, Unia was relegated to the third level, never to return.

The men's team of KP Unia Racibórz currently plays in the Silesian group of the IV liga, the 5th level of the Polish association football system.

The men's football team of Unia Racibórz were also the U-19 Champion of Poland twice (1954 and 1956).

Club names 
 27 April 1946 - Klub Sportowy Plania Racibórz
 June 1949 - ZKS Chemik Racibórz
 November 1949 - ZKS Unia Racibórz
 18 March 1957 - Unia Racibórz Sports Club
 1997 - RTP Unia Racibórz
 2008 - Klub Piłkarski Unia Racibórz

Achievements
 8th in the Ekstraklasa: 1964,
 Polish U-19 Champion: 1954, 1956
 Polish U-19 Bronze Medal: 1958
 Polish Cup semi-final - 1956-57

Statistics

Highest division 
The club's historic achievement is eighth place in the season 1963-64 season in the first division. It was the first season at the highest league level. In the season 1964-65, Unia finished last and were relegated.

League history

Top Scorer 
Unia's players were the top scorers of the 2nd league five times. In the 1958, 1959 and 1960 seasons it was Manfred Urbas (shooting the

References

External links 
 Official website
 90minut.pl profile

1946 establishments in Poland
Association football clubs established in 1946
Football clubs in Silesian Voivodeship
Racibórz County